En Magan is 1945 Indian Tamil-language romantic war film directed by R. S. Mani and written by A. S. A. Sami. Based on the American play Waterloo Bridge by Robert E. Sherwood, the film stars N. Krishnamoorthi, U. R. Jeevarathnam, D. Balasubramaniam and Kumari Kamala. It was released on 3 November 1945, and emerged a commercial success. No print of the film is known to survive, making it a lost film.

The film was created as a World War II-related propaganda film, at the request of the government of Tamil Nadu.

Plot 
The film starts with the son of a wealthy man from the countryside, who arrives in Madras in pursuit of a better education. He falls in love with the daughter a successful lawyer, but learns that his old-fashioned father is preparing an arranged marriage for him. He protests and his relationship with his father deteriorates. He is unaware that his father's chosen girl is the woman who he has fallen in love with.

The young man feels heartbroken because he can not obtain the woman he loves. He decides to join the Indian Air Force, willing to fight against the Axis powers. He is posted to British Burma, where his airplane is eventually shot down by enemy forces. His lover assumes that he has died, and decides to become a wartime nurse and take care of suffering people.

The young man has actually survived, and is transported to a hospital. The nurse who tends to him is his lover, and the misunderstandings opposing their relationship are cleared. The lovers marry, and the film has a happy ending.

Cast 

Male cast
 N. Krishnamurthi as Selvam
 D. Balasubramaniam as Murthy Mudaliar
 N. S. Narayana Pillai as Padmanabhan
 B. Rajagopala iyer as Shivasamy Mudaliar
 Nat Annaji Rao as Astrologer
 P. Rama Iyer Shastri as Murthy's accountant
 T. M. Gopal as Pillai (Worker)
 S. Ramanathan as Ramanathan
 D. V. Narayanasami as Narayanan
 S. R. Krishna Iyengar as I. A. F. Officer, Military Doctor
 K. R. V. Sharma as Venu
 N. Shankaramurthi as Japanese Army Officer
 A. C. Irusappan as Japanese Army Officer

Female cast
 U. R. Jeevarathnam as Vimala
 M. M. Radha Bai as Alamu
 Baby Kamala as Kamala
 C. K. Saraswathi as Kalyani
 C. V. Masilamani as Sarasu
 M. Jayamma as A. N. S. Nurse
 N. R. Meera Bai as A. N. S. Nurse

Production 
In 1945, during World War II, the government of Tamil Nadu requested three Tamil film producers to make propaganda films. Central Studios, one of them, decided to make En Magan, an adaptation of the American play Waterloo Bridge by Robert E. Sherwood. R. S. Mani directed the film, and A. S. A. Sami wrote the screenplay. Cinematography was handled by V. Krishnan and K.Durai, and editing by S. Surya.

Soundtrack 
Music was composed by Papanasam Sivan and C. A. Lakshmana Das, who together also wrote the lyrics.

Release 
En Magan was released on 3 November 1945, Diwali day, and was distributed by Jupiter Pictures. It was a commercial success. No print of the film is known to survive, making it a lost film.

References

External links 
 

1940s lost films
1940s romance films
1940s Tamil-language films
1940s war films
1945 films
Films set in 1945
Films set in Chennai
Films set in Myanmar
Films set in Tamil Nadu
Indian black-and-white films
Indian films based on plays
Indian romance films
Indian war films
Lost Indian films
War romance films
Indian World War II films
World War II propaganda films
Indian Air Force in films
Films about shot-down aviators